The National Museum of Prehistory (NMP) is located in Taitung City, Taitung County, Taiwan.

History
In 1980, during the construction of the South-Link Line, building work uncovered prehistoric remains on the Beinan Site (卑南遺址). Many slate coffins and artifacts were discovered, and after a proposal by the Taitung City Government, construction of Taitung Station was halted. For 10 years, a National Taiwan University-led team excavated the  site and uncovered over 1,500 burials and tens of thousands of artifacts. The site is widely regarded as the most important site of the mid-Neolithic age in Taiwan, and was then later transformed into the Beinan Cultural Park.

An outdoor museum was proposed and approved in 1990. Trial operations began on July 10, 2001, and the museum officially opened on August 17, 2002.

The museum underwent renovation starting on 31 May 2020.

Architecture
The museum was designed by American architect Michael Graves and is situated on a  parcel of land.

The museum is divided into several sections, including:
 Sun Square
 Mountain Square
 Administrative Building
 Scenic Garden
 Children's Play Area
 The Maze
 Water Fountain Show
 Bird Singing Square
 Sightseeing Hill.

Exhibitions
 Natural History of Taiwan designed by MET Studio, London
 Prehistory of Taiwan
 Indigenous Peoples of Taiwan designed by MET Studio, London

Transportation
The museum is accessible within walking distance from Kangle Station of the Taiwan Railways.

Branches
 Museum of Archaeology in Tainan

See also
 List of museums in Taiwan
 Beinan Cultural Park

References

2002 establishments in Taiwan
Archaeological museums in Taiwan
Prehistory
Museums in Taitung County
Museums established in 2002
Michael Graves buildings